Breer is a surname. Notable people with the surname include:

Albert Breer (born 1980), American football journalist and reporter
Carl Breer (1883–1970), American automotive industry engineer
Murle Breer (born 1939), American golfer
Robert Breer (1926–2011), American experimental filmmaker, painter, and sculptor